Amoeiro is a town (Concello) of the Province of Ourense in Galicia. It is part of the comarca of Ourense.

It connects with the towns of: San Cristovo de Cea, Vilamarín, Coles, Ourense, Punxín and Maside.

Population in 2016: 2264 inhabitants.

Places of Amoeiro
See: Places of Amoeiro.

References

Municipalities in the Province of Ourense